In Moroccan cuisine, Ahriche(ⴰⵃⵔⵉⵛ) is a dish eaten by the tribes of Zayanes and Khénifra. The name is derived from the Berber word for stick; this is in reference to the dish's manner of cooking. It is a dish of tripe usually consisting of ganglion, caul, lung or heart of an animal wound with intestines on a stick of oak and cooked on hot coals.

See also
 List of Middle Eastern dishes
 List of African dishes
 Berber cuisine

References
frdic.fr dictionary

Moroccan cuisine
Berber cuisine
Offal
Middle Eastern grilled meats